Andrei Aleksandrovich Drevin (26 August 1921 — 7 April 1996) was a Russian sculptor. His parents were prominent Russian painter Nadezhda Udaltsova and Latvian painter Aleksandr Drevin.

As his father was executed by the NKVD in 1938 and his mother became a persona non grata in the world of Soviet art, Andrei Drevin had found it difficult to establish himself as an artist. However he overcame these challenges and became well known in Moscow due to his monument to Ivan Krylov which was erected near Patriarshiye Ponds.

References 

1921 births
1996 deaths
Artists from Moscow
Russian people of Latvian descent
20th-century Russian male artists
Russian male sculptors
Soviet sculptors